This is a list of the known railway proposals in Queensland, Australia, either formally approved by the Queensland Parliament or otherwise recorded in some formal way, that were never built.

Approved by Parliament
Laura - 48 km towards Maytown, approved 1888

Croydon - 85 km towards Georgetown, approved 1895, being the amount of rail in storage at Croydon following the diversion of the line from Cloncurry. The rail was later used to construct part of the Mt Isa line to Cloncurry.
 
Gladstone  -  Callide Coalfields, approved 1900. A different line to Callide Coalfields was built in 1952 via the Callide Valley line, and connected to Gladstone in 1968 when the Moura Short Line was opened.

Miriam Vale – Glassford copper mine, approved 1900

Great Western Railway and connecting lines, approved 1910

Via Recta (Mt Edwards – Maryvale), proposed to provide a direct Brisbane – Warwick line, approved 1914

Burketown – Lawn Hill silver mine, approved 1914

Wandoan – Taroom, approved 1914

Extension of the South Western line from Dirranbandi to Boomi (New South Wales), approved 1914.

Extension of the Brisbane Valley railway line from Yarraman to Nanango, approved 1914

Texas – Silver Spur mine, approved 1914

Glenmorgan – Surat, approved 1914

Lawgi – Monto, approved 1920

Brooloo – Kenilworth, approved 1920

Dobbyn – 80 km towards Burketown, approved 1920

Peeramon – Boonjie, approved 1920

Croydon – Georgetown, approved 1929.

Other proposals
Cooyar – Tarong, mentioned in the parliamentary approval debate concerning the Tarong line

Rosewood – Rosevale, shown on a 1925 map as ‘Approved of by Parliament’

Gatton – Mount Sylvia, shown on a 1925 map as ‘Approved of by Parliament’

External links
 1925 map of the Queensland railway system

See also
Rail transport in Queensland

References

Railway lines in Queensland
Closed railway lines in Queensland
Unbuilt buildings and structures in Australia
Rilway lines approved by the Queensland Parliament but never constructed
Australian railway-related lists